Newburg is the name of some places in the U.S. state of Pennsylvania:

Newburg, Blair County, Pennsylvania
Newburg, Clearfield County, Pennsylvania
Newburg, Cumberland County, Pennsylvania
Newburg, Huntingdon County, Pennsylvania
Newburg, Northampton County, Pennsylvania